Bob Bryan and Mike Bryan were the defending champions, but did not participate this year.

Paul Hanley and Todd Woodbridge won the title, defeating Rick Leach and Brian MacPhie 6–4, 6–3 in the final.

Seeds

  Paul Hanley /  Todd Woodbridge (champions)
  Mark Knowles /  Daniel Nestor (quarterfinals)
  Rick Leach /  Brian MacPhie (final)
  Mark Merklein /  Todd Perry (quarterfinals)

Draw

Draw

External links
 Draw

Nottingham Open
2004 ATP Tour
2004 Nottingham Open